Ilija Dimoski (born 27 June 1939) is a Macedonian football manager and former player. He is nicknamed "Majstorot".

He played a total of 790 games, 249 with FK Pobeda and 541 with FK Radnički Niš, and despite being a full-back, he scored 74 goals, 17 for Pobeda and 57 for Radnički. He was an offensive full-back who very often participated in the attack, something of an avangard for the football of the 1960s and 1970s. He was also the main penalty-shoot taker in the clubs he played, rarely missing. However, he also entered in the history of Yugoslav football because of the high number of own-goals he scored, 8, one with Pobeda and seven with Radnički. He was also well known by his strong shots, which he usually executed with the out side of the foot. He was known as a right full-back, however, during his 13-years long career with Radnički he occasionally played in every position except as goalkeeper, but in 1957 on one acasion he even played as goalkeeper, while he was still playing with Pobeda.

Playing career
Born in Prilep, Vardarska banovina, Kingdom of Yugoslavia, he played as right full-back with local side FK Pobeda between 1957 and 1961. When he started playing Pobeda was playing in third level, but in 1959 they got promoted to the Yugoslav Second League. In 1961 he was signed by Serbian side FK Radnički Niš which were rivals of Pobeda in the league. However, Dimoski will play with Radnički only one more season in Yugoslav second level, since Radnički was an ambitious team and achieved promotion to the Yugoslav First League after just one season since Dimoski joined the club. It was the start of a major rise of Radnički and the beginning of a period of over two decades in which Radnički became among the most stable Yugoslav clubs. Dimoski became a crucial player of this generation and stayed in the club 13 years. When he finished his spell with Radnički in 1974, the club direction nominated him as the main coach, however only three days later Đorđe Kačunković replaced him, and so Dimoski entered Yugoslav football history as the coach with the shortest spell in a club.  In 1974, he had a short spell with lower-level side FK Proleter Novi Sad.

Managerial career
After retiring, Dimoski became a coach. He became assistant manager of Kučunković at Radnički Niš, and help the club win its first major international trophy, the 1974 Balkans Cup.  He will later lead Radnički Niš as main coach to their maximal achievement in Europe, taking them to the semi-finals of the 1981–82 UEFA Cup.  After coaching Radnički Niš, he coached FK Vardar, FK Pobeda, FK Pelister, FK Osogovo, FK Rabotnički, FK Napredok, FK Bregalnica Delčevo, FK Priština, FK Radnički Pirot, etc. He also coached in Australia, Footscray JUST in 1989.

References

1939 births
Living people
Sportspeople from Prilep
Macedonian footballers
Yugoslav footballers
Association football midfielders
FK Pobeda players
FK Radnički Niš players
FK Proleter Novi Sad players
Yugoslav First League players
Macedonian football managers
Yugoslav football managers
FC Prishtina managers
FK Radnički Niš managers
FK Radnički Pirot managers
FK Pobeda managers
FK Vardar managers
FK Pelister managers
FK Napredok managers
FK Osogovo managers
FK Rabotnički managers
FK Bregalnica Delčevo managers
Macedonian expatriate football managers
Expatriate football managers in Serbia
Macedonian expatriate sportspeople in Serbia
Expatriate soccer managers in Australia
Macedonian expatriate sportspeople in Australia